Streets of Rage is a beat 'em up game developed and published by Sega for the Genesis in 1991. Players control one of three former police officers turned vigilantes who battle a crime syndicate. Streets of Rage establishes many conventions of the Streets of Rage series, such as two-player cooperative play and an acclaimed techno soundtrack from composer Yuzo Koshiro. It was ported for the Game Gear, Sega CD and Master System and has been rereleased as part of various compilations and on download services.

Gameplay 

Streets of Rage is a beat 'em up featuring aspects of Double Dragon and Final Fight. Players act as Adam, Axel, or Blaze who saves the city from being overtaken by a criminal syndicate led by Mr. X. The three traverse eight levels and all have a total of 40 moves, such as headbutts, backslams, and reverse kicks. Surrounding the landscape are weapons that can be used to attack enemies, such as knives, glass bottles, pipes, and baseball bats, and food items that increase energy, such as apples and chicken.

As in Sega's previous beat 'em up Golden Axe, enemies walk onto the screen from both sides as well as occasionally appearing from other locations. Foes include ninjas, punks, and women in bondage, and up to 12 can appear on a screen. The player must defeat each opponent to progress through eight locations, known as rounds. With the exception of round 7, there is a boss battle at the end of every round with a disproportionately large enemy. Unlike its sequels, none of the enemies are named within the game (they are named only in the Japanese version's manual) and only the bosses have a visible life bar.

Players also have a limited number of special attacks that allow them to call the police and summon a police car that fires explosives, damaging all enemies on screen. The player is given one special attack per life or per level and power-ups shaped like police cars supply additional specials.

Development
Lead designer Noriyoshi Oba broached the idea of doing a street fighting game along the lines of Final Fight and Double Dragon with Yuzo Koshiro. Oba was also influenced by action television shows such as Starsky & Hutch and The A-Team. The game was designed for players to focus on preventing enemies from swarming them, as well as to work with a second player using various cooperative team moves.

Releases

Ports

Collections
A signature title and franchise for Sega during the Mega Drive era, the title was collected often.
Mega Games II (compiled with Golden Axe and The Revenge of Shinobi) that was later bundled with the Mega Drive.
Sega Classics Arcade Collection (a Mega CD compilation with the two previously mentioned titles, plus Super Monaco GP and Columns, also available as in cartridge format for Mega Drive II). The voice effects for the characters in this version of the game were all redone.
Sega Genesis 6-PAK (composed of Streets of Rage, Sonic the Hedgehog, Columns, The Revenge of Shinobi, Golden Axe and Super Hang-On); and Mega 6 (composed of Streets of Rage, World Cup Italia '90, Columns, Super Monaco GP, The Revenge of Shinobi and Sonic the Hedgehog).
Streets of Rage, along with its two sequels, is  included in the Japanese version of the Sonic Gems Collection for the GameCube and PlayStation 2, but was omitted from the North American GameCube version to avoid it gaining an E10+ rating, and also from the European GameCube and PlayStation 2 versions for unknown reasons. They were previously available on GameTap until the service shutdown in 2015.
Streets of Rage along with both of its sequels are included in Sonic's Ultimate Genesis Collection for Xbox 360 and PlayStation 3.
AtGames had released several plug and plays of the Sega Genesis both in SD and HD that includes all three Streets of Rage titles along with other Sega Genesis hits like Golden Axe and Sonic the Hedgehog.
In 2012, Streets of Rage Collection, a package of all three Streets of Rage games, was released on Xbox Live Arcade as part of the Sega Vintage Collection range of titles. 
On 26 January 2011, Streets of Rage was released on Valve's Steam platform, both as a standalone purchase and part of the SEGA Mega Drive Classics Pack 4.
On 21 August 2013, 3D Streets of Rage was released for Nintendo 3DS, both as an Nintendo eShop standalone purchase and later on 18 December 2014 as a part of the Sega 3D Fukkoku Archives.
On 29 May 2018, Sega released Sega Genesis Classics (known as Sega Mega Drive Classics in PAL regions) which includes Streets of Rage 1-3.

Reception

The game topped the UK Mega Drive charts upon release. Streets of Rage went on to be one of the best-selling Sega games, .

Streets of Rage was well received. Electronic Gaming Monthly claimed it was "a winner in a category that was lacking on the 16-bit Sega" and "a real version of Double Dragon for the Genesis". The magazine's critics were quick to call it the best fighting game of all time, making it superior to all other titles such as Final Fight; they highlighted its "superb graphics, terrific interaction", huge amount of attacks, and two-player mode, and called its music "funkadelic" and better than Sonic the Hedgehog. Mega Play's four reviewers also called it the best all-time fighting, praising the graphics, soundtrack, and described the gameplay as "street fighting action at its best!"

MegaTech magazine review said it had "excellent sprites, backdrops and brilliant music. Add in great gameplay and simultaneous two-player action and you've got an essential buy." Mega placed the game at Number 6 in its Top Mega Drive Games of All Time. Reviewing the game in Sega Arcade Classics for the Sega CD, Glenn Rubenstein wrote in 1993 it "still holds up well." Mega Zones Brian Costelloe magazine cited the music, level backgrounds and boss fights. He called the music the "most hyped" of all-time, its shipyard graphics the best on the consoles. He and Electronic Gaming Monthly were also amazed by the large size of the boss.

Legacy

Streets of Rage was followed by three sequels, Streets of Rage 2, Streets of Rage 3 and Streets of Rage 4. There were plans for two further sequels, one of which was developed by Core Design for the Sega Saturn, but Sega pulled the Streets of Rage name during development after a disagreement with Core about porting it to rival formats; the game was eventually released as Fighting Force. A fourth true game in the series, Streets of Rage 4, was developed and released by Lizardcube, Guard Crush Games, and DotEmu on April 30, 2020.

Comics
Three six-part comic strip series based upon the games appeared in Sonic the Comic in the early 1990s (along with several other adaptations of popular Sega franchises). The first two of these were written by Mark Millar, who has since become popular writing The Authority for Wildstorm, and Ultimate X-Men and The Ultimates for Marvel, while the third (along with a Poster Mag story) was written by Nigel Kitching. Peter Richardson produced the artwork for all nineteen episodes. These three stories are based on Streets of Rage 2 and do not feature Adam. A graphic novel compilation of the original 5-part "Streets of Rage" strip was released as a book called "Streets of Rage: Bad City Fighters" in the UK in 1994.

The first story, entitled simply Streets of Rage, appeared in STC #7–12 and involved Axel, Blaze, and Max quitting the highly corrupt police force to do more good as vigilantes, taking down Max's ex-partner, the crime lord and martial artist Hawk.

The next serial, Skates' Story, appeared in STC #25–30 and introduced Skates, delinquent stepson of Murphy, a friend of Axel and his team and one of the few honest cops left on the force, who was unwillingly drawn into joining Axel's group after his parents were killed by Mr. X.

A special one-off story, called The Facts of Life, appeared in "Sonic the Poster Mag" #7 and involved the heroes causing a racket by fighting one of the many street gangs in a sleeping neighborhood. The police arrive and arrest the thugs, as well as take the heroes to a junkyard for execution. Along the way, Axel explains why he, Blaze, and Max quit the force to a young rookie officer. At the junkyard, just as the officers are about to shoot Max, the rookie officer unlocks Blaze's handcuffs, who proceeds to beat the stuffing out of the cops, with Axel, Skates, and Max following shortly. After the dust clears, the rookie officer says that he's seen the true colors of the police force and requests that Axel hit him. Axel does so until Blaze tells him to stop, and they and Max and Skates leave as dawn breaks.

The third and final serial, called The Only Game In Town, appeared in STC #41–46 and involved the Syndicate unleashing an army of street gangs on our heroes, with the event turned into a gambling event as Mr. X opened a book based on whether or not the heroes would reach the river without being killed first. This ploy was played against the villain when Blaze bet $20,000 on her team's survival at odds of a thousand to one. This third story was notable for revealing that, for his failure, the old Mr. X had been the victim of a "swimming accident" and had been replaced with a new one by the Syndicate at story's end. Like many non-Sonic stories in this magazine, the story had a cliff-hanger ending, with the new Mr. X promising that he would "recoup his losses" and kill the heroes.

Soundtrack

The game's soundtrack was acclaimed, with several soundtrack albums being released. The soundtracks were composed by Yuzo Koshiro. Another musician, Motohiro Kawashima, helped on the second, providing a few tracks, and making even more for the third. Three soundtrack CDs were released in all, each of which now sell for high prices at auction and in Japanese markets.

When the first game's development began in 1990, Koshiro was influenced by electronic dance music, specifically house and techno, and wanted to be the among the first to introduce those sounds in video games. The soundtrack shows the influence of contemporary R&B and hip hop music. Koshiro said "the most important element in recreating club music sounds for the games was to emulate the timbre and percussion sounds of Roland's rhythm machines" (the most famous models being the TR-606, TR-707, TR-808, and TR-909), stating that "it wouldn't be an exaggeration to say that that sound defined the genre."

Animation
In 2014, Sega formed the production company Stories International and teamed up with film producer Evan Cholfin for animated projects based on its games, with Streets of Rage one of them.

Notes

References

External links

Streets of Rage Online

1991 video games
Arcade video games
Cooperative video games
iOS games
Nintendo 3DS eShop games
Overworks games
PlayStation Network games
Sega beat 'em ups
Sega CD games
Game Gear games
Sega Genesis games
Master System games
Streets of Rage games
Video games developed in Japan
Video games with oblique graphics
Virtual Console games
Xbox 360 Live Arcade games
Multiplayer and single-player video games
Side-scrolling beat 'em ups
Video games scored by Yuzo Koshiro
Video games with alternate endings
Organized crime video games